Spring Falling is the second extended play (EP) by South Korean singer, Yesung. It was released on April 18, 2017 by SM Entertainment and Label SJ, and distributed by KT Music.

Background and release
On March 31, Label SJ stated, “Yesung is currently working on a solo album with the goal to release it in April. It is a full album and not part of SM Station.”.

On April 6, Label SJ revealed Yesung will return with his second solo album “Spring Falling” on April 18.

Ahead of the album’s release, he will pre-release a music video for “Hibernation”, a medium tempo ballad track with a soothing melody. Its lyrics contain the sweet message of not wanting to leave one’s lover’s side because it is warmer than a cozy spring day on April 11.

On April 13, Yesung revealed teasers, highlight medley and track list featuring Cho Kyuhyun.

On April 18, the title track "Paper Umbrella" music video was released. The album Spring Falling topped iTunes album charts in five countries including Japan, Thailand, Singapore, Hong Kong, and Peru. Additionally, in Japan, Thailand, Singapore, Indonesia, Hong Kong, Peru, Mexico, and Hungary, the album took first place in the pop album chart, while in Japan, Thailand, Singapore, Indonesia, Hong Kong, Peru, Chile, and Mexico, it placed No. 1 in the K-pop album chart.

Track listing

References

External links
 Yesung's official website

2016 EPs
EPs by South Korean artists
Korean-language EPs
SM Entertainment EPs